MAMADOU is a Senegalese music band.  Originally called "Mamadou Diop and the Jolole Band", the group was founded in early 1998, later simplifying their name to "MAMADOU" in late 2000.

The group began when West African rhythm guitarist and singer Mamadou Diop was introduced to a group of jazz musicians consisting of Czech guitarist Pavel Jirka, bassist John Pfister, and drummer Ted Sillars.  Soon afterwards, they changed their format to exclusively original and traditional songs influenced by West African rhythms mixed with cubano, salsa, merengue, reggae, mbalax, and various other styles.  Senegalese percussionist Ibrahima Camara was brought in to provide sabar drumming, accompanied by Mamadou and Ted Sillars during "percussion jams".  Finally, keyboardist Adam Zampino joined the band. The band has performed extensively throughout the Northeast United States and has released three albums. As of 2016, the current configuration includes Mamadou Diop, keyboardist Adam Zampino, singer and percussionist Michelle Cherie Foss-Zampino, drummer Mitch Cohen, bassist Erik Bistany, and lead guitarist Jake Pardee.

Unlike most other African music groups, this band was started in the United States.  They are based in Salem, Massachusetts, and the accompanying musicians are mostly American artists.

References 
Winner of the 2011 Boston Music Award for International Artist of the Year, winner of IRAWMA for the international reggae and world music awards (nominated in 2002, 2011, 2012, and 2015), Mamadou Diop and his band MAMADOU are known for their eclectic blend of exotic rhythms and powerful percussion jams that will set your feet and spirit dancing! Weaving together diverse musical traditions with the powerful rhythms of West Africa, the unique and high energy music of MAMADOU sets feet and spirits dancing. The band performs original music based on authentic African rhythms and arrangements, composed by Mamadou Diop of Dakar, Sénégal, who takes these fundamental African rhythms and layers them throughout his music.

At the heart of MAMADOU's music is the drum. Powerful are the rhythms of Sénégal, making a connection with the soul of each listener. Each musician is given command of separate, offset rhythms, making this music among the most danceable around. Sung in Wolof (Mamadou Diop's native language), French, and English, the songs speak of the importance of love, friendship, and spirit; all in a manner that transcends language and cultural barriers. MAMADOU has been enthusiastically received by club and festival audiences who welcome the opportunity to experience their joyful combination of musical genres.

External links 
 MAMADOU web site
 Biography
 Loud Dust Recordings

MAMADOU
1998 establishments in Senegal